A non-exhaustive listing of ships which have sunk as a result of striking ice masses of larger than "growler" or pack size (such collisions with minor ice are comparatively common, usually resulting in less damage). Note that many vessels have been lost without a trace in seas containing icebergs; these are not listed due to other possible explanations and lack of survivor testimony.

See Also
 Futility - 1898 novella about a fictional ship sunk by an iceberg, noted to have similarities to the Titanic.

References